Robson José Brilhante Martins (born 20 October 1998), commonly known as Robinho, is a Brazilian professional footballer who plays as a forward for CSA, on loan from Red Bull Bragantino.

References

External links

1998 births
Living people
Sportspeople from Recife
Brazilian footballers
Association football forwards
Clube Náutico Capibaribe players
América Futebol Clube (PE) players
Goiás Esporte Clube players
Red Bull Bragantino players
Clube de Regatas Brasil players
Paysandu Sport Club players
Campeonato Brasileiro Série B players
Campeonato Brasileiro Série C players